The Frontiersman is a 1927 American silent Western film directed by Reginald Barker and written by Tom Miranda and Gordon Rigby. The film stars Tim McCoy, Claire Windsor, Tom O'Brien, Russell Simpson, Lillian Leighton and Louise Lorraine. The film was released on June 11, 1927, by Metro-Goldwyn-Mayer.

Cast 
 Tim McCoy as John Dale
 Claire Windsor as Lucy
 Tom O'Brien as Abner Hawkins
 Russell Simpson as Andrew Jackson
 Lillian Leighton as Mrs. Andrew Jackson
 Louise Lorraine as Athalie Burgoyne
 May Foster as Mandy
 Chief John Big Tree as Grey Eagle
 Frank Hagney as White Snake
 Hans Joby as Col. Coffee

References

External links 
 

1927 films
1927 Western (genre) films
Metro-Goldwyn-Mayer films
Films directed by Reginald Barker
American black-and-white films
Silent American Western (genre) films
1920s English-language films
1920s American films